Five Bloody Graves is an American western film directed by Al Adamson and starring Robert Dix, Scott Brady, Jim Davis, John Carradine, Paula Raymond. Fruita, Utah was used as a setting for the film.

Cast
Robert Dix as Ben Thompson
Scott Brady  Jim Wade
Jim Davis as Clay Bates
John Carradine as Boone Hawkins
Paula Raymond as Kansas Kelly
John Cardos as Joe Lightfoot/Satago
Vicki Volante as Nora Miller

References

External links

1969 Western (genre) films
1969 films
Films directed by Al Adamson
1960s English-language films
1960s American films